54 Columns is a public art installation in Atlanta, Georgia, USA by artist Sol LeWitt. Located at the corner of Glen Iris Drive and North Highland Ave., the large-scale sculpture consists of 54 concrete columns in a grid-like arrangement. The overall shape of the installation is approximately triangular with dimensions of 112 x 176 feet (34 x 54 meters). The columns range in height from 10 to 20 feet (3.05 to 6.1 meters).

Background 

Sol LeWitt (Sept. 9, 1928 – April 8, 2007) is regarded as a pioneer in the movements of both minimal art and conceptual art. LeWitt often integrates art and architecture in his work. 54 Columns is an example of this combination. The installation loosely mirrors the Atlanta skyline which is visible from the site. The use of concrete (an industrial material) by LeWitt is a recognition of and a reflection of the artwork's urban setting. Several private donors assisted by the High Museum of Art made this gift to the people of Fulton County possible. At the time of installation, Gregor Turk, Fulton County's public art coordinator called LeWitt's abstract representation “simultaneously lowbrow and highbrow.”

History 
This minimalistic sculpture was commissioned by the Fulton County Arts Council in 1999. 54 Columns has generated some controversy. In 2003 local residents displeased with the look of the concrete structures planted dogwood trees among the columns to cover them up. The City of Atlanta determined that “the trees spoiled the sanctity of LeWitt’s installation”, and the dogwoods were removed. In 2005, one of the columns was painted pink. In 2022, the Fulton County Board of Commissioners approved $100,000 (US) to renovate 54 Columns. The revitalization will include a new entrance path, stadium-style seating for events, and upgraded landscaping and signage.

References 

Art in Atlanta
Public art in Georgia (U.S. state)